Presto is a 2008 American computer animated short film by Pixar, shown in theaters before their feature-length film WALL-E. The short is about Presto, a magician who is trying to perform a show, but his rabbit, Alec, would not cooperate with him until he gets his carrot. The short is a gag-filled homage to classic cartoons such as Tom and Jerry and Looney Tunes, as well as the work of Tex Avery. Presto was written and directed by veteran Pixar animator Doug Sweetland, in his directorial debut with the story written by Ted Mathot, Valerie Lapointe and Justin Wright.

The original idea for the short was a magician who incorporated a rabbit into his act who suffered from stage fright. This was considered to be too long and complicated, and the idea was reworked. To design the theater featured in Presto, the filmmakers visited several opera houses and theaters for set design ideas. Problems arose when trying to animate the theater's audience of 2,500 patrons; this was deemed too expensive, and was solved by showing the back of the audience.

Reaction to the short was positive, and reviewers of WALL-E film's home media release considered it to be an enjoyable special feature (though it was not included with the subsequent Criterion 4K Blu-ray). Presto was nominated for an Annie Award and Academy Award. It was included in the Animation Show of Shows in 2008.

Plot
Vaudeville era magician Presto DiGiotagione is famous for a hat trick wherein he pulls his rabbit Alec Azam out of his top hat. A hungry and irritated Alec is locked in a cage, unable to reach his carrot. After Presto returns from eating a meal, he begins practicing his act with Alec, revealing that his top hat is magically connected to a wizard's hat kept backstage with Alec. Anything that passes into either hat will emerge from the other.

Intending to feed Alec, Presto realizes that his show is starting and rushes onstage instead. Alec refuses to cooperate with the act until he is given the carrot, and turns the hats against Presto in a variety of ways that lead to escalating degrees of humiliation, such as letting him catch his finger in a mousetrap, hit himself in the eye with an egg, and get his head sucked into a ventilation shaft; each of these mishaps is interpreted by the audience as being part of the act. Presto continues to antagonize Alec at the same time, first turning the carrot into a flower and later smashing it to pulp with a piece of a ladder, resulting in Alec sticking Presto's hand in an electrical socket via the wizard's hat.

Fed up with Alec's behavior, Presto storms backstage after him, but releases a set of hanging stage props and gets his foot caught in a rigging rope. He is yanked up into the fly space above the stage; when his foot comes loose, he falls and finds himself in danger of being crushed by both the props and a falling piano. Realizing this, Alec uses the hats' magic to save Presto, earning the audience's wild approval for the both of them. Presto gratefully gives Alec the carrot (having used his magician skills to return it to its original form) and starts to give him second billing on the posters advertising the act.

Production

Doug Sweetland made his directorial debut with Presto. Sweetland provides the dialogue-free voice acting for both of the movie's characters. He pitched the film at the start of 2007 and began production late in the year, completing it in May 2008. Presto's gag based format was heavily influenced by classic cartoons. Looney Tunes cartoons directed by Tex Avery were a major influence, with Alec being easily compared to Bugs Bunny. Other influences include Tom and Jerry, the Marx Brothers, and Charlie Chaplin. The character design for Presto was based on William Powell.

The original scenario for the short involved a magician who incorporates an autograph seeking rabbit into his act after his previous rabbit leaves him. Complications arise as the new rabbit suffers from stage fright. Sweetland compared it to the plot of A Star Is Born. The idea was reworked due to being too long and complicated, taking an estimated three minutes longer to tell.

To achieve the highly formal environment, the filmmakers looked at the Royal Opera House in London, the Paris Opera House and classic vaudeville theaters like the Geary in San Francisco—which the crew took a tour through—for set design ideas. Animating the theater's audience of 2,500 patrons proved an expensive proposition, even with the help of the crowd-generating MASSIVE software.

Early suggestions were to show cutaways of just a small portion of the audience, but the full effect was achieved by only showing the back of the audience. To save time, most of the audience models were borrowed from the previous Pixar film, Ratatouille. Additionally, Presto's body (from the neck down) is Skinner's lawyer, and the carrot was one of the many food props from that film.

Reception
Reaction to the short film was positive. Carl Cortez of If called Presto a "winner through and through". Jake Coyle of the Associated Press found Presto to be "a delightful and cartoonish appetizer" which kept the tradition of short pre feature films alive. Darren Bevan of Television New Zealand thought that although WALL-E was a "delightful tale" and "truly gorgeous", Presto "very nearly stole WALL-E's thunder". James Sanford of the Kalamazoo Gazette called the short a superb and hilarious curtain raiser, describing it as a Bugs Bunny Looney Tunes version of The Prestige. Presto was nominated for the 36th Annie Award for Best Animated Short Subject. The short was also nominated for the Academy Award for Best Animated Short Film, but lost to La Maison en Petits Cubes.

Notes

a: A play on the word 'prestidigitation'.
b: A play on the magic word 'alakazam'.

References

External links
 
 
 

2008 short films
2008 animated films
2000s American animated films
2000s animated short films
2008 comedy films
2008 films
American animated short films
Animated films about rabbits and hares
Films about magic and magicians
Films directed by Doug Sweetland
Animated films without speech
Pixar short films